Aleksandar Ponjavić (born March 3, 1991) is a Serbian professional basketball player for Zlatibor the Basketball League of Serbia.

External links
 Profile at aba-liga.com
 Profile at eurobasket.com
 Profile at realgm.com

1988 births
Living people
Kaposvári KK players
KK Šentjur players
KK FMP (1991–2011) players
KK Radnički FMP players
KK Igokea players
KK Zlatibor players
OKK Borac players
People from Gornji Milanovac
Serbian men's basketball players
Serbian expatriate basketball people in Bosnia and Herzegovina
Serbian expatriate basketball people in France
Serbian expatriate basketball people in Hungary
Serbian expatriate basketball people in Iran
Serbian expatriate basketball people in Slovenia
Shooting guards